Marion Price Daniel Sr. (October 10, 1910August 25, 1988), was an American jurist and politician who served as a Democratic U.S. Senator and the 38th governor of Texas.  He was appointed by President Lyndon B. Johnson to be a member of the National Security Council, Director of the Office of Emergency Preparedness, and Assistant to the  President for Federal-State Relations.  Daniel also served as Associate Justice of the Texas Supreme Court.

Early life
Marion Price Daniel Sr (properly Marion Price Daniel II) was born October 10, 1910 in Dayton, Texas, to Marion Price Daniel Sr (1882–1937) and Nannie Blanch Partlow (1886 –1955), in Liberty Texas.  He was the eldest child.  Sister Ellen Virginia Daniel was born in 1912, and brother William Partlow Daniel in 1915. Price, as he was commonly known, was married to Jean Houston Baldwin, great-great granddaughter of legendary Texas figure Sam Houston. As a teenager Daniel was a reporter for the Fort Worth Star-Telegram. He put himself through law school at Baylor University by working as a janitor and dishwasher and by working at the Waco News Tribune.  He received his degree from Baylor in 1932.  After graduation he established his own practice in Liberty County and often accepted livestock and acreage for his fees.

Texas House of Representatives
In 1938, he was elected to the Texas House of Representatives. He was subsequently re-elected twice, serving in the 46th, 47th, and 48th legislature from January 10, 1939 until January 9, 1945.   Daniel opposed Texas adopting a sales tax.

He served on these committees during the 46th legislature (January 10 – June 21, 1939): judiciary; oil, gas, and mining; privileges, suffrage, and elections (vice chair); and public lands and buildings.

He served on these committees during the 47th legislature  (January 14 – July 3, 1941 and September 9–19, 1941): judiciary; privileges, suffrage, and elections; public lands and buildings (vice chair); and revenue and taxation.

He was elected as Speaker of the House for the 48th legislature (January 12 – May 11, 1943).

World War II military service

When the legislature adjourned in May 1943, Daniel waived his draft exemption and enlisted in the United States Army, serving in the Security Intelligence Corps.   In this capacity, he saw service in Amarillo, Texas, Pine Bluff, Arkansas and Baton Rouge, Louisiana.  He received his Second Lieutenant commission in 1944 after training at the Judge Advocate General Officers School in Ann Arbor, Michigan, afterwards becoming an instructor at the Army School for Personnel Services in Lexington, Virginia.  The Army shared Daniel with the United States Marine Corps in 1945, the latter sending him to Sasebo, Nagasaki, Japan to set up a Marine Personnel School.  He received "outstanding authority" citations from both branches of service, and was discharged in May 1946.

Texas Attorney General

Price returned to Texas after his military service and won the seat of Texas Attorney General.

As Texas State Attorney General, he argued the 1946 submerged lands ownership lawsuit United States v. California, 332 U.S. 19 before the Supreme Court of the United States in 1947, on behalf of the coastal states.  The Supreme Court decided against California on June 23, 1947.

Daniel defended the University of Texas law school in the 1950 Sweatt v. Painter  desegregation case.  Herman Marion Sweatt, a black student, was denied admission to the University of Texas Law School in February 1946.  Sweatt had met all the requirements, except that Texas schools were segregated by law.  The Supreme Court of the United States ruled in June, 1950, Sweatt must be allowed admission.

United States Senate

In 1952,  Daniel was elected to the United States Senate. He was immediately taken under the wing of Senate Minority Leader Lyndon B. Johnson, with the senior senator helping to alleviate office space shortage by allowing Daniel's staff to work out of LBJ's office.

Daniel held positions on committees of the Interior; Interstate and Foreign Commerce;  Post Office and Civil Service; and Judiciary, as well as Judiciary subcommittees on Internal Security and Juvenile Delinquency.

The new senator worked on a narcotics probe and reforming the electoral college.

Opposed to desegregation efforts, Senator Price Daniel joined 19 other senators and 77 members of the United States House of Representatives in signing the 1956 Southern Manifesto, which condemned the 1954 United States Supreme Court decision in Brown v. Board of Education,  and encouraged states to resist implementing it.  The Supreme Court's 1958 Cooper v. Aaron   decision held that the states were bound to uphold the previous decision on desegregation.

Tidelands and 1952 elections

The most long-lasting accomplishment of Price Daniel was in helping to retain Texas title to the submerged lands, and mineral rights therein, off the coast.  The victory has netted billions of dollars for Texas schools.  Texas viewed this issue as of primary importance during the 1952 campaign.  Eisenhower supported state ownership, while Adlai Stevenson stood in opposition.  The state of Texas, including many prominent state Democratic party leaders, went with Eisenhower who won the state of Texas in the election.

Texas acquired the rights as a republic, and later reserved the rights when it entered the Union in 1845. The Texas legislature authorized the School Land Board to execute the mineral leases on behalf of the Permanent School Fund.

Among coastal states, the Federal government claimed ownership when oil was discovered on the lands.    The first lawsuit, United States v. California, 332 U.S. 19, was filed by the Federal government against California in 1946.  The attorneys general of all other states filed an amicus curiae brief in opposition.  Price Daniel Sr., as Texas State Attorney General, argued the case before the Supreme Court of the United States on March 13–14, 1947, on behalf of all the other states.  In 1947, the Supreme Court decided against California on June 23, 1947.

Congress presented a 1952 bill confirming states' ownership, which was vetoed by President Harry Truman.  In that same year, Presidential  candidate General Dwight D. Eisenhower stated his belief that the Annexation Agreement of Texas gave the rights to Texas.  Candidate Adlai Stevenson announced he would veto any bill out of Congress guaranteeing the rights to Texas.  The Texas state Democratic convention passed a resolution urging all its members to vote for Eisenhower.

In 1953, then Senator Price Daniel
 was one of 35 co-sponsors to the Florida Senator Spessard Holland-authored Senate Joint Resolution 13 restoring the right of the submerged lands to the coastal states.  Daniel, together with Lyndon Johnson, Spessard Holland and Senate Majority Leader Robert A. Taft worked tirelessly to overcome the 27-day filibuster of the bill, with it passing the Senate 56-35 votes, and approved by the House of Representatives on May 13.   President Eisenhower signed the bill into law on May 22, 1953.

Governor

Senator Daniel was elected governor in 1956. Thereafter, Daniel's chief Democratic rival Ralph Yarborough went on to succeed Daniel after a temporary appointee, William A. Blakley of Dallas, in the Senate in a special election held in 1957.

As governor, Daniel saw legislative fruition of his proposals to reorganize of the State Board of Insurance, passage of an ethics code for lawmakers and other state employees,  regulation of lobbyists, an improved structure for state archives, and  a long-range water conservation plan.

Daniel was re-elected governor in 1958 by a 7-1 margin over the Republican Edwin S. Mayer (1896-1963), a San Angelo sheep and goats owner who was twice a delegate for Dwight D. Eisenhower at the 1952 and 1956 Republican National Conventions. In 1960, Mayer was the only delegate at the national convention who abstained on the nomination of former U.S. Senator Henry Cabot Lodge, Jr., of Massachusetts as Richard Nixon's running mate.

In 1960, Daniel won renomination over Jack Cox, an oil equipment executive from Houston. Daniel then prevailed in the general election by a much larger margin than that obtained by John F. Kennedy and Lyndon B. Johnson as the Democratic presidential and vice presidential nominees. Daniel received 1,637,755 votes (72.8 percent) to Republican William M. Steger of Tyler, who obtained 612,963 ballots (27.2 percent), but Kennedy and Johnson barely won the Texas electoral votes over Richard Nixon.

In 1961, the legislature passed a 2-cent sales tax, which Daniel allowed to become law without his signature so the state would remain solvent. After the passage of the sales tax, Daniel's popularity waned, and he failed at his attempt to be elected to a fourth term in 1962. He lost the Democratic nomination to former Navy Secretary John B. Connally, Jr. Other 1962 Democratic candidates included Highway Commissioner Marshall Formby of Plainview, State Attorney General Will Wilson, a future Republican convert, and Major General Edwin A. Walker, a segregationist who also made anticommunism the centerpiece of his campaign. Connally's most formidable primary opponent was Don Yarborough, a liberal integrationist lawyer from Houston who won 49% of the vote in the Democratic run-off. Connally went on to defeat Cox, who had switched to Republican affiliation, to claim the right to succeed Daniel as governor.

Public service in later years

President Johnson later appointed Daniel to head the Office of Emergency Preparedness. In 1971, Governor Preston Smith named Daniel to the 9-member Texas Supreme Court, filling a vacancy left by the retirement of Clyde E. Smith. He was re-elected twice in 1972 and 1978, and retired at the end of his second term.

After retiring from the Texas Supreme Court, he served as pro-bono legal council for the Alabama-Coushatta Indians. As their counsel, he was instrumental in the 1965 creation of the Texas Commission for Indian Affairs (TCIA), 59th Legislature, House Bill 1096. On April 5, 1967, the Texas Legislature passed House Concurrent Resolution No. 83 recognizing Daniel for his contributions to the tribe and to the creation of the TCIA.

The historian Charles Waite of the University of Texas-Pan American in Edinburg describes Daniel, particularly in regard to his early years in politics, as a "southern business progressive who promoted efficiency in government in regard to roads, schools, and agriculture." Though he stood with Franklin D. Roosevelt, who swept Texas on four occasions, Daniel was skeptical of the growing federal bureaucracy and generally opposed tax increases to pay for added costs of government.

Personal life
Marion Price Daniel Sr. is also known as Marion Price Daniel Jr. and as Marion Price Daniel II, because his father, Marion Price Daniel Sr. (1882–1937) was the first generation with the name. Daniel II married the former Jean Houston Baldwin on June 28, 1940. Their son publicly known as  Price Daniel Jr. is properly Marion Price Daniel III. The couple also had three other children:  Jean Houston Murph, Houston Lee, and John Baldwin.

Governor Daniel died of a stroke on August 25, 1988, and is interred at the family ranch in Liberty County. His wife died December 14, 2002 and is buried with him.

Legacy

Price Daniel Sr. State Office Building, Austin, is part of the Texas State Capitol Complex 
Price Daniel Distinguished Public Service Award, Baylor Alumni Association

Jean and Price Daniel Home and Archives

The Jean and Price Daniel Home and Archives came under full ownership of the State of Texas in October 1998. Governor and Mrs. Daniel began construction on the Greek Revival style  Liberty, Texas house in 1982, with an official opening in 1984. It was patterned after the governor's mansion in Austin designed by architect Abner Cook. The home is the repository of the library, archives, furniture,  and mementos that document the Daniels' lives and years of public service.

It is maintained and funded by the Atascosito Historical Society and located on the grounds of the Sam Houston Regional Library and Research Center, a part of the Archives and Information Services Division of the Texas State Library and Archives Commission. Admission is free. Tours are available by appointment; group tours must be arranged two weeks in advance.

Organization memberships

Price Daniel was a member of the following organizations:

American Legion
Benevolent and Protective Order of Elks
Freemasons
Pi Kappa Delta
Rotary International
Shriners
Sigma Delta Chi
Woodmen of the World
Veterans of Foreign Wars

References

Further reading

External links

The Jean and Price Daniel House and Archives

Historic photographs of Price Daniel, hosted by the Portal to Texas History
Governor's Message to the 56th legislature., hosted by the Portal to Texas History
 

|-

|-

|-

|-

|-

|-

|-

|-

|-

1910 births
1988 deaths
People from Dayton, Texas
United States Army personnel of World War II
Baylor University alumni
Democratic Party governors of Texas
Speakers of the Texas House of Representatives
Democratic Party members of the Texas House of Representatives
Texas Attorneys General
Texas lawyers
American white supremacists
Justices of the Texas Supreme Court
Democratic Party United States senators from Texas
20th-century American judges
20th-century American lawyers
20th-century American politicians
United States Army officers
United States Marine Corps personnel of World War II
United States Marine Corps officers
Military personnel from Texas